Akina is a suburb of Hastings City, in the Hawke's Bay Region of New Zealand's North Island.

The suburb includes Akina Park, Hawke's Bay soccer and softball park.

Demographics

Akina had a population of 5,193 at the 2018 New Zealand census, an increase of 372 people (7.7%) since the 2013 census, and an increase of 567 people (12.3%) since the 2006 census. There were 1,953 households, comprising 2,514 males and 2,679 females, giving a sex ratio of 0.94 males per female, with 1,158 people (22.3%) aged under 15 years, 1,077 (20.7%) aged 15 to 29, 2,283 (44.0%) aged 30 to 64, and 672 (12.9%) aged 65 or older.

Ethnicities were 68.6% European/Pākehā, 26.8% Māori, 5.4% Pacific peoples, 12.8% Asian, and 2.5% other ethnicities. People may identify with more than one ethnicity.

The percentage of people born overseas was 19.3, compared with 27.1% nationally.

Although some people chose not to answer the census's question about religious affiliation, 48.0% had no religion, 33.7% were Christian, 2.3% had Māori religious beliefs, 2.9% were Hindu, 1.2% were Muslim, 0.5% were Buddhist and 5.1% had other religions.

Of those at least 15 years old, 561 (13.9%) people had a bachelor's or higher degree, and 927 (23.0%) people had no formal qualifications. 291 people (7.2%) earned over $70,000 compared to 17.2% nationally. The employment status of those at least 15 was that 2,031 (50.3%) people were employed full-time, 579 (14.3%) were part-time, and 156 (3.9%) were unemployed.

Education

It provided secondary education for years 9 and 10 from 1998, and expanded to cover up to year 13 by 2010.

References

Suburbs of Hastings, New Zealand